Law enforcement in Belarus is the responsibility of a variety of agencies such as the Militsiya, as well as other agencies such as the Presidential Guard and the State Security Agency of the Republic of Belarus, all under the authority of the country's Ministry of Internal Affairs.

List of agencies

Militsiya (Міліцыя) is the police service of Belarus, under the supervision of the Ministry of Internal Affairs, which considered as the main policing and law enforcement agency in Belarus.
Internal Troops (Унутраныя войскі) is a uniformed paramilitary gendarmerie force.
6th Independent Special Police Brigade of the Internal Troops 
OMON (АМАП) is a system of special police units in the Militsiya (distinct from the Russian OMON)

Secret police organizations
Presidential Guard
State Security Agency of the Republic of Belarus (KDB in Belarusian, KGB in Russian)
State Forensic Examination Committee of the Republic of Belarus
Investigative Committee of the Republic of Belarus
Prosecutor General of Belarus
Byelorussian Auxiliary Police (Defunct)

Cooperation with international agencies
The Ministry of Internal Affairs has cooperated with several international law enforcement organisations including Interpol and the United Nations Office on Drugs and Crime. Examples also include the Organization for Security and Co-operation in Europe which, under the auspices of many projects and programmes, has helped develop Belarusian law enforcement capabilities.

Prisons
Amerikanka
Pishchalauski Castle

References